Shlomo Niazov (שלמה ניאזוב; born May 12, 1962) is an Israeli former Olympic boxer.

Niazov is Jewish, and was born in Tel Aviv, Israel.

Boxing career
When Niazov competed in the Olympics, he was 5-7.5 (172 cm) tall, and weighed 132 lbs (60 kg). He is left-handed.

Niazov competed for Israel at the 1984 Summer Olympics in Los Angeles, at the age of 22, in Boxing--Men's Lightweight, and came in tied for 33rd. Niazov was the first Israeli Olympic boxer.

1984 Olympic results
Below is the record of Shlomo Niazov, an Israeli lightweight boxer who competed at  the 1984 Los Angeles Olympics:

 Round of 64: lost to Asif Dar (Pakistan) by decision, 0-5

Professional boxing career

In 1985 and 1986, Niazov fought five professional matches as a super lightweight. He won four of them, all by knockout.

Coaching career
In 2000, he and Tal Niazov founded the Israel Professional Boxing Organization (IPBO) in Raanana, Israel.

They operate Combined Martial Arts (CMA), which runs 12 gyms in Israel where some 500 people come to train in all kinds of martial arts and boxing. Their best students as of 2007 were Elad Shmouel, Ran Nakash, and Hagar Finer.

References

External links

Living people
Jewish boxers
Olympic boxers of Israel
Israeli male boxers
Lightweight boxers
1962 births
Israeli Jews
Boxers at the 1984 Summer Olympics
Sportspeople from Tel Aviv
Light-welterweight boxers